Ampitatafika is a town and commune in Madagascar. It belongs to the district of Antanifotsy, which is a part of Vakinankaratra Region. The population of the commune was 32,955 in 2018.

Primary and junior level secondary education are available in town. The majority 95% of the population of the commune are farmers.  The most important crop is rice, while other important products are beans, maize and potatoes.  Services provide employment for 5% of the population.

Notable people 
 

Honoré N. Razafindramiandra (1939-1996), Malagasy politician

References and notes 

Populated places in Vakinankaratra